Millers Flat is a small town in inland Otago, in the South Island of New Zealand. It is located on the Clutha River, 17 kilometres south of Roxburgh. Fruit growing is the main industry in the area. Most of the town lies on the north bank of the Clutha; the main road, State Highway 8, passes close by on the river's other bank.  The Roxburgh Branch railway used to pass through the town; it was opened to Millers Flat in 1925 and was the terminus for approximately two and a half years, until the section to Roxburgh was opened.  The line was closed in 1968, though the town's station platform and some of the railway formation still exist.

Millers Flat was originally called Ovens Hill; its current name is in honour of an early European settler, Walter Miller, who farmed in the area from about 1849.

Millers Flat Bridge was designed by Robert Hay (1847–1928) and construction started in 1897. It was opened in 1899.

Demographics
Millers Flat is described by Statistics New Zealand as a rural settlement. It is part of the much larger Teviot Valley statistical area. 

Millers Flat had a population of 87 at the 2018 New Zealand census, a decrease of 3 people (-3.3%) since the 2013 census, and a decrease of 12 people (-12.1%) since the 2006 census. There were 42 households. There were 39 males and 48 females, giving a sex ratio of 0.81 males per female. The median age was 61.2 years (compared with 37.4 years nationally), with 6 people (6.9%) aged under 15 years, 9 (10.3%) aged 15 to 29, 36 (41.4%) aged 30 to 64, and 36 (41.4%) aged 65 or older.

Ethnicities were 96.6% European/Pākehā, and 6.9% Māori (totals add to more than 100% since people could identify with multiple ethnicities).

Although some people objected to giving their religion, 48.3% had no religion, and 41.4% were Christian.

Of those at least 15 years old, 9 (11.1%) people had a bachelor or higher degree, and 30 (37.0%) people had no formal qualifications. The median income was $26,300, compared with $31,800 nationally. The employment status of those at least 15 was that 36 (44.4%) people were employed full-time, 9 (11.1%) were part-time, and 3 (3.7%) were unemployed.

Grave of Somebody's Darling

Approximately 8 km downstream of Millers Flat on the Clutha River are the remains of the Horseshoe Bend Gold Diggings, now largely remembered for the story of "Somebody's Darling" and the Lonely Graves.

Early in 1865 the body of a young man was discovered at Rag Beach, upstream and on the opposite side of the river from the present site of the Lonely Graves.  An inquest held on 22 February 1865 in the Horseshoe Hotel determined the body to be that of Charles Alms who had fallen in the river at Mutton Town Creek, some considerable distance upstream.  Alms, a butcher from the Nevis had been swimming cattle across the river when he had been thrown from his horse and washed away. The body was buried in an unmarked grave and the gravesite remained untended.  Later in that same year a miner named William Rigney arrived at Horseshoe Bend, and with John Ord erected a fence of rough manuka poles around the previously untended grave.  Rigney obtained a piece of black pine and made a simple headstone for the grave.  With a four-inch nail he inscribed the words "Somebody's Darling lies buried here."  In 1903 a marble headstone was erected.  William Rigney died in 1912 and was buried beside "Somebody's Darling."

Education

References

External links

Populated places in Otago
Central Otago District